Victory Day is a holiday that commemorates the Soviet victory over Nazi Germany in 1945. It was first inaugurated in the 15 republics of the Soviet Union, following the signing of the German Instrument of Surrender late in the evening on 8 May 1945 (9 May Moscow Time). The Soviet government announced the victory early on 9 May after the signing ceremony in Berlin. Although the official inauguration occurred in 1945, the holiday became a non-labor day only in 1965, and only in certain Soviet republics.

In East Germany, 8 May was observed as Liberation Day from 1950 to 1966, and was celebrated again on the 40th anniversary in 1985. In 1967, a Soviet-style "Victory Day" was celebrated on 8 May. Since 2002, the German state of Mecklenburg-Vorpommern has observed a commemoration day known as the Day of Liberation from National Socialism, and the End of the Second World War.

The Russian Federation has officially recognized 9 May since its formation in 1991 and considers it a non-working holiday even if it falls on a weekend (in which case any following Monday will be a non-working holiday). The holiday was similarly celebrated there while the country was part of the Soviet Union. Most other countries in Europe observe Victory in Europe Day (often abbreviated to VE Day, or V-E Day) on 8 May, and Europe Day on 9 May as national remembrance or victory days.

History

The German Instrument of Surrender was signed twice. An initial document was signed in Reims on 7 May 1945 by Alfred Jodl (chief of staff of the German OKW) for Germany, Walter Bedell Smith, on behalf of the Supreme Commander of the Allied Expeditionary Force, and Ivan Susloparov, on behalf of the Soviet High Command, in the presence of French Major-General François Sevez as the official witness. Since the Soviet High Command had not agreed to the text of the surrender, and because Susloparov, a relatively low-ranking officer, was not authorized to sign this document, the Soviet Union requested that a second, revised, instrument of surrender be signed in Berlin. Joseph Stalin declared that the Soviet Union considered the Reims surrender a preliminary document, and Dwight D. Eisenhower immediately agreed with that. Another argument was that some German troops considered the Reims instrument of surrender as a surrender to the Western Allies only, and fighting continued in the East, especially in Prague.

A second surrender ceremony was organized in a surviving manor in the outskirts of Berlin late on 8 May, when it was already 9 May in Moscow due to the difference in time zones. Field-Marshal Wilhelm Keitel, chief of OKW, signed a final German Instrument of Surrender, which was also signed by Marshal Georgy Zhukov, on behalf of the Supreme High Command of the Red Army, and Air Chief Marshal Arthur Tedder, on behalf of the Allied Expeditionary Force, in the presence of General Carl Spaatz and General Jean de Lattre de Tassigny, as witnesses. The surrender was signed in the Soviet Army headquarters in Berlin-Karlshorst. Both English and Russian versions of the instrument of surrender signed in Berlin were considered authentic texts.

The revised Berlin text of the instrument of surrender differed from the preliminary text signed in Reims in explicitly stipulating the complete disarmament of all German military forces, handing over their weapons to local Allied military commanders.

Both the Reims and Berlin instruments of surrender stipulated that forces under German control to cease active operations at 23:01 hours CET on 8 May 1945. However, due to the difference in Central European and Moscow time zones, the end of war is celebrated on 9 May in the Soviet Union and most post-Soviet countries.

To commemorate the victory in the war, the ceremonial Moscow Victory Parade was held in the Soviet capital on 24 June 1945.

Celebrations

In Russia
During the Soviet Union's existence, 9 May was celebrated throughout it and in the Eastern Bloc. Though the holiday was introduced in many Soviet republics between 1946 and 1950, it became a non-labour day only in the Ukrainian SSR in 1963 and the Russian SFSR in 1965. In the Russian SFSR, a weekday off (usually a Monday) was given if 9 May fell on a Saturday or Sunday.

The celebration of Victory Day continued during subsequent years. The war became a topic of great importance in cinema, literature, history lessons at school, the mass media, and the arts. The ritual of the celebration gradually obtained a distinctive character with a number of similar elements: ceremonial meetings, speeches, lectures, receptions and fireworks.

In Russia during the 1990s, the 9 May holiday was not celebrated with large Soviet-style mass demonstrations due to the policies of successive Russian governments. Following
Vladimir Putin's rise to power, the Russian government began promoting the prestige of the governing regime and history, and national holidays and commemorations became a source of national self-esteem. Victory Day in Russia has increasingly become a celebration in which popular culture plays a central role. The 60th and 70th anniversaries of Victory Day in Russia (2005 and 2015) became the largest popular holidays since the collapse of the Soviet Union.

In 1995, as the world celebrated the 50th anniversary of the end of the war, many world leaders converged on Moscow to attend the city's first state sponsored ceremonies since the end of the Soviet Union. In 2015 around 30 leaders, including those of China and India, attended the 2015 celebration, while Western leaders boycotted the ceremonies because of the Russian military intervention in Ukraine.  The 2020 edition of the parade, marking the 75th anniversary of the victory over Nazi Germany, was postponed due to the COVID-19 pandemic.

Russophone populations in many countries celebrate the holiday regardless of its local status, organize public gatherings and even parades on this day. Some multilanguage broadcasting television networks translate the "Victory speech" of the Russian president and the parade on Red Square for telecasts for viewers all over the globe, making the parade one of the world's most watched events of the year. RT also broadcasts the parade featuring live commentary, and also airs yet another highlight of the day – the Minute of Silence at 6:55pm MST, a tradition dating back to 1965.

Because of massive losses among both military and civilians during Great Patriotic War, Victory Day is still remains as one of the most important and emotional dates in Russia.

Other countries currently celebrating 9 May

  Armenia has officially recognized 9 May since its independence in 1991. It is officially known as Victory and Peace Day. The holiday was similarly celebrated there while the country was part of the Soviet Union. Shushi Liberation Day is also commemorated with the holiday.
  Azerbaijan has officially recognized 9 May since 1994. Upon its independence in 1991, the Azerbaijani Popular Front Party and later the government of Abulfaz Elchibey deliberately erased the holiday from the calendar, with veterans being subjected to a targeted anti-Russian/Soviet media campaign. Upon coming to power, Heydar Aliyev restored the holiday to the national calendar. The holiday is similarly celebrated as it was while the country was part of the Soviet Union. A wreath laying ceremony is usually held at the monument to Hazi Aslanov.
  Belarus has officially recognized 9 May since its independence in 1991 and considers it a non-working day. The holiday was similarly celebrated there while the country was part of the Soviet Union. Belarus has had five Victory Day Parades on Masherov Avenue (1995, 2005, 2010, 2015 and 2020) and has had an annual ceremony on Victory Square since independence.
  Bosnia and Herzegovina has officially recognized 9 May since its independence. However, it is not a working day only in Republic of Srpska.
  Georgia has officially recognized 9 May since its independence in 1991. The holiday was similarly celebrated there while the country was part of the Soviet Union. It is particularly celebrated in this way with the Russian community in the country.
  In Israel, Victory Day on 9 May has historically been celebrated as an unofficial national remembrance day. However, in 2017, Victory in Europe Day was upgraded to the status of an official national holiday day of commemoration by the Knesset, with schools and businesses operating as usual. As a result of immigration of many Red Army veterans, Israel now hosts the largest and most extensive Victory Day celebrations outside the former Soviet Union. Traditions and customs of Victory Day are the same as in Russia, with marches of Immortal Regiments held in cities with large populations of Red Army veterans and their descendants.
  Kazakhstan has officially recognized 9 May since its independence in 1991 as a national holiday. The holiday is sometimes celebrated in connection with the Defender of the Fatherland Day holiday on 7 May. From 1947 the holiday was similarly celebrated there while the country was part of the Soviet Union. 
  Kyrgyzstan has officially recognised 9 May since its independence in 1991. The holiday was similarly celebrated there while the country was part of the Soviet Union. 
  Moldova officially recognises 9 May as a public holiday since its independence in 1991. From 1951 to 1991, the holiday had also been celebrated during the country's rule by the Soviet Union as the Moldavian SSR. It is now officially known as the "Victory Day and Commemoration of the Fallen Heroes for the Independence of the Fatherland". Today, Victory Day is a major national holiday, particularly due to Moldova's Russian community and also due to the Party of Socialists of the Republic of Moldova (PSRM) and its state-sponsored Victory Day rallies of 2017 on the Great National Assembly Square at Chișinău. Wreath-laying ceremonies are commonly held at the Eternity Memorial Complex of Chișinău during the day.
  Mongolia had officially recognized 9 May during its existence as a satellite state of the Soviet Union. The holiday continues to be celebrated unofficially throughout the country.
  Montenegro officially recognised 9 May as Victory Day over Fascism as an official holiday.
  Serbia celebrates 9 May as Victory Day over Fascism but it's a working holiday. Still many people gather to mark the anniversary with the war veterans, including the Serbian Army, Minister of Defense and the President. The holiday was similarly celebrated there while the country was part of SFR Yugoslavia.
  Tajikistan has officially recognised 9 May since its independence following the dissolution of the Soviet Union. The holiday was similarly celebrated there while the country was part of the Soviet Union.
  Turkmenistan has officially recognised 9 May since its independence in 1991. It officially known as the Day of Remembrance of National Heroes of Turkmenistan in the 1941–1945 World War. It was established by a special decree of President of Turkmenistan Saparmurat Niyazov in 2000. The holiday was similarly celebrated there while the country was part of the Soviet Union. Since 2018, it has not been a public holiday. Various events are conducted at famous parks such as Altyn Asyr Park and the National Cultural Centre's Palace of Mukams. In recent years, Turkmen prisoners have received pardons from the President of Turkmenistan on Victory Day.
  Ukraine officially recognised 9 May from its independence in 1991 until 2013, where it was a non-working day. If it fell on a weekend the following Monday was non-working. The holiday was similarly celebrated there while the country was part of the Soviet Union. As of 2015, Ukraine officially celebrates Victory Day over Nazism in World War II on 9 May, per a decree of parliament. Additionally the term "Great Patriotic War" as a reference was replaced with "Second World War" in all Ukrainian legislation. Since 15 May 2015 Communist and Nazi symbols are prohibited in Ukraine. Before 15 May 2015, Ukraine held military parades in the capital on Khreshchatyk in 1995, 2001, 2010, and 2011, and 2013. In February 2023 a bill was submitted to parliament to abolish 9 May as a public holiday.
  Uzbekistan has officially recognised 9 May from 2 March 1999, where the holiday was introduced as the "Day of Remembrance and Honour" (Xotira va Qadirlash Kuni). It is the only country in the Commonwealth of Independent States to not officially recognize the 9 May holiday as Victory Day. Under President Islam Karimov, the holiday was toned down, with many veterans being told not to wear their Soviet-era decorations or uniforms on the holiday. Since Karimov's death in 2016, the holiday has been celebrated there similarly to how it was celebrated while the country was part of the Soviet Union.

Countries formerly celebrating 9 May
  Bulgaria officially recognized 9 May during its existence as a satellite state of the Soviet Union. Since 1989, all official celebrations of 9 May have been cancelled. As in other EC countries, Victory Day in Bulgaria is 8 May, whereas 9 May is Europe Day. However, many still gather unofficially (particularly russophiles, eurosceptics and leftists) to celebrate Victory Day on 9 May. Flowers are generally laid at the Monument to the Soviet Army in Sofia.
  Romania officially recognized 9 May as a public holiday during its existence as a satellite state of the Soviet Union. The holiday also commemorated independence from the Ottoman Empire in 1878. Victory Day in Romania is now celebrated on 8 May, whereas 9 May is celebrated as Europe Day. However, some Russophiles, Eurosceptics and leftists gather at informal meetings to celebrate Victory Day on 9 May. Thus, it may mark a triple celebration in the country.

Unrecognized states celebrating Victory Day
  The Donetsk People's Republic has officially recognised 9 May since its declaration of statehood in 2014. The holiday is similarly celebrated there as it was part of Ukraine.
  The Luhansk People's Republic has officially recognised 9 May since its declaration of statehood in 2014. The holiday is similarly celebrated there as it was part of Ukraine.
  Transnistria has officially recognised 9 May since its declaration of independence in 1990. From 1951 the holiday was similarly celebrated there while the country was part of the Soviet Union.
  The Republic of Artsakh has officially recognised 9 May since its declaration of independence in 1991. From 1951 the holiday was similarly celebrated there while the country was part of the Soviet Union. It coincides with the country's Liberation Day, celebrating the Armenian victory in the Capture of Shushi.
  Abkhazia has officially recognised 9 May since its declaration of independence in 1990. From 1951 the holiday was similarly celebrated there while the country was part of the Soviet Union.
  South Ossetia has officially recognised 9 May since its declaration of independence in 1990. From 1951 the holiday was similarly celebrated there while the country was part of the Soviet Union.

Former states
  From 1948 to 1993, the communist-dominated Czechoslovak Socialist Republic celebrated the holiday on 9 May in concert with the Soviet Union. Then, it was mainly celebrated with a military parade of the Czechoslovak People's Army (ČSLA) on Letná every five years to mark the end of World War II and the anniversary of the Prague uprising (the first one took place in 1951 while the last of these parades took place in 1985). Since the Dissolution of Czechoslovakia in 1993, Czech Republic has officially recognized 8 May as Liberation Day (Den osvobození). In recent years the Prague uprising and liberation of Plzeň by American troops have been commemorated on 5 May.
  The German Democratic Republic recognized Tag der Befreiung (Day of liberation) on 8 May, it was celebrated as a public holiday from 1950 to 1966, and on the 40th anniversary in 1985. Only in 1975 was the official holiday on 9 May instead and that year called Tag des Sieges (Victory Day). In Federal Republic of Germany, events are held on 8 May to commemorate those who fought against Nazism and lost their lives in World War II. Also, on 8 May, the German state of Mecklenburg-Vorpommern since 2002 has recognised a commemorative day Tag der Befreiung vom Nationalsozialismus und der Beendigung des 2. Weltkrieges (Day of Liberation from National Socialism, and the End of the Second World War).
  officially recognised 9 May from 1965 to its disestablishment after the Yugoslav Wars. The first victory parade was held on Bulevar revolucije in the presence of Marshal Josip Broz Tito in 1965 and was held every 5 years since (save for 1980) until the final parade in 1985.
  Soviet Union celebrated 9 May since 1945, with the day becoming a public holiday since 1965 in some Soviet Republics.

Holiday traditions

Victory Day Parades

Victory Day Parades are military parades that are held on 9 May, particularly in various post-soviet nations such as Russia, Kazakhstan, Belarus, and until 2015, Ukraine. Outside of the former Soviet Union, military victory parades have also been held in Serbia, Poland and the Czech Republic. The first victory day parade on Red Square took place with the participation of the Red Army and a small detachment from the First Polish Army on 24 June 1945. After a 20-year hiatus, the parade was held again and became a regular tradition among Eastern Bloc countries and Soviet allies. Countries that had this tradition included Yugoslavia and Czechoslovakia, both of which had their last parades in 1985. After the fall of the Soviet Union, they quickly fell out of style in Europe and soon became a practice among post-Soviet nations, many of which have large Russian populations. In 1995, Russia, Kazakhstan, Belarus, and Ukraine held parades for the first time since 1991.

Mass processions
In Belarus on non-jubilee years, a procession is held from October Square, which ends with the laying of wreaths on Victory Square. In 2015, a parade of young people, cadets of military lyceums, young athletes took place on Bishkek's Ala-Too Square, attended by President Almazbek Atambayev and Prime Minister Temir Sariev.

The Immortal Regiment is a massive civil event staged in major cities in Russia and around the world every 9 May. Since it was introduced in 2012, it has been conducted in cities such as Moscow, Washington D.C., Dushanbe, Berlin, and Yekaterinburg. Participants carry pictures of relatives and/or family members who served during the Second World War. The front line of the procession carries a banner with the words Bessmertniy Polk written on it. Up to 12 million Russians have participated in the march nationwide in recent years.  Since 2015, the President Vladimir Putin and senior Russian officials have participated in the procession in Moscow. It has come under criticism by those who charge that participants are carrying photographs and discarding them after the event.

Gatherings at monuments
Members of government usually take part in a wreath-laying ceremony at their national war memorial, usually dedicated to the specific war victory. Wreaths are often laid at memorials such as the Tomb of the Unknown Soldier (Moscow), the Monument to the Unknown Sailor (Odessa), and the Monument to Hazi Aslanov (Baku). Although Latvia does not officially recognize 9 May, most of the large Russian community informally celebrates the holiday, with trips to the Victory Memorial to Soviet Army being common in Riga, with some diplomats (ambassadors of Russia, Kazakhstan, and Belarus) as well as some politicians (Nils Ušakovs, Alfrēds Rubiks) also taking part.

Religious commemorations
In the Easter message of 1945, the Patriarch Alexy I of Moscow wrote:

Every 26 April (Old Style, O.S.; 9 May, New Style or N.S.), the Russian Orthodox Church commemorates the dead, being the only special remembrance day for the dead with a fixed date. After the liturgy, a memorial service for the fallen soldiers is served in all churches and monasteries under the Orthodox Church. The annual commemoration on Victory Day "of the soldiers who for faith, the Fatherland and the people laid down their lives and all those who died in the Great Patriotic War of 1941–1945" was established by the Bishops' Council of the Russian Orthodox Church in 1994. On the eve of the 65th anniversary in  2010, Patriarch Kirill of Moscow gave his blessing for all the churches of the Russian Orthodox Church to perform a "prayer service in memory of the deliverance of our people from a terrible, mortal enemy, from a danger that our Fatherland has not known in all history". The patriarch composed a special prayer for this rite, taking as a basis the prayer of Philaret Drozdov, written in honor of the victory of the Imperial Russian Army over the French Grande Armee during the Napoleonic Wars. The completion of the Main Cathedral of the Russian Armed Forces was timed to Victory Day in 2020.

Other events
Traditions such as the Victory Relay Race are held on jubilee anniversaries. In 2013, Turkmenistan conducted live-fire military exercises "Galkan-2013" (Shield-2013) dedicated to the 68th anniversary of the Victory, observed by President Gurbanguly Berdymukhamedov at the Kelyata Training Center of the Ministry of Defence of Turkmenistan in the Bäherden District of the Ahal Region. In 2016, Moldovan Defence Minister Anatol Șalaru attended a display of vehicles from the Moldovan National Army and the United States Army in the central park of Chisinau. In April 2020, an official in the Western Military District of Russia announced that an air show would be held at Kubinka air base in Victory Day.

On Victory Day, many books on topics such as the war such as Panfilov's Twenty-Eight Guardsmen are published. On the eve of the diamond jubilee, President Vladimir Putin, at the request of Chancellor Sebastian Kurz, gave a live address broadcast Austrian TV channel ORF.

Soviet and post-Soviet symbols associated with Victory Day

Banner of Victory

The Victory Banner refers to the Soviet military banner raised by the Soviet soldiers on the Reichstag building in Berlin on 1 May 1945. Made during the Battle of Berlin by soldiers who created it while under battlefield conditions, it has historically been the official symbol of the Victory of the Soviet people against Nazi Germany. Being the 5th banner to be created, it was the only army flag that was prepared to be raised in Berlin to survive the battle. The Cyrillic inscription on the banner reads: "150th Rifle, Order of Kutuzov 2nd class, Idritsa Division, 79th Rifle Corps, 3rd Shock Army, 1st Belorussian Front", representing the unit that soldiers who raised the banner were from. On 9 May, a specially made replica of the Victory Banner is carried by a color guard of the 154th Preobrazhensky Independent Commandant's Regiment through Red Square. The Victory Banner was brought to Kyiv from Moscow in October 2004 to take part in the parade in honor of the 60th Anniversary of the Liberation of Ukraine. In 2015, the banner was brought to Astana to participate in the Defender of the Fatherland Day parade on 7 May.

Saint George's Ribbon

The Ribbon of Saint George is a military symbol that dates back to the era of the Russian Empire. It consists of a black and orange bicolour pattern, with three black and two orange stripes. 
In the early 21st century, it became an awareness ribbon to commemorate the veterans of the war, being recognized as a patriotic symbol. In countries such as Ukraine and the Baltic states, it has been associated recently with Russophilia and Russian irredentism. It has become especially associated with Russian support for the 2022 Russian invasion of Ukraine. In Ukraine the government chose to replace it with the remembrance poppy which is associated with the Remembrance Day commemorations in the United Kingdom and the British Commonwealth.

On 5 May 2014, the Belarusian Republican Youth Union encouraged activists not to use the ribbon due to the situation in Ukraine. In time for Victory Day 2015, the ribbon's colors were replaced there by the red, green and white from the Flag of Belarus.

Awards

Soviet Union

Russia

Ukraine

Azerbaijan

Kazakhstan

Turkmenistan
Jubilee Medal "60 Years of the Victory in the Great Patriotic War 1941–1945"
Jubilee Medal "75 Years of the Victory in the Great Patriotic War 1941–1945"

Israel

Gallery of the celebrations

See also
 End of World War II in Europe
 Hero city
 Immortal Regiment
 Moscow Victory Day Parade
 Pobediteli
 Pobedobesie
 Reunification Day (Vietnam)
 Time of Remembrance and Reconciliation
 Victory Day in other countries
 Victory Day Parades (9 May)
 Victory over Japan Day

Notes

References

External links
 
 Major photos period of time
 
 
 Interactive map of the Great Patriotic War between the Soviet Union and Nazi Germany
 9 мая, 1991 год, Алма-Ата
 The Russian evening newscast featuring the celebrations of the 50th anniversary of V-E Day in Russia on C-SPAN
 Russian Army Parade (1995)
 Russian Army Parade,  Red Square (1995)
 Мероприятия ко Дню победы в Ереване

Aftermath of World War II in Germany
Aftermath of World War II in the Soviet Union
Public holidays in Azerbaijan
Public holidays in Russia
Public holidays in Belarus
Public holidays in Georgia (country)
Public holidays in Turkmenistan
Public holidays in Moldova
Public holidays in Transnistria
Public holidays in Mongolia
Public holidays in Kazakhstan
Public holidays in Kyrgyzstan
Public holidays in Tajikistan
Public holidays in the Soviet Union
Public holidays in Israel
May observances
Victory days
Former public holidays in Ukraine
2015 disestablishments in Ukraine
Spring (season) events in Russia
Articles containing video clips